"This Is War" is a song by American rock band Thirty Seconds to Mars, featured on their third studio album of the same name. Written by lead vocalist Jared Leto, the song was released as the second single from the album to American radio on March 8, 2010, and the physical single was released on March 26, 2010.

Music video
The music video was shot on April 7, 2010. A 30-second teaser was released and the music video was set to premiere in June 2010. However, it was delayed. The film features 30 Seconds to Mars as US soldiers deployed to Afghanistan. The video was supposedly leaked on April 1, 2011. In response to the leak, the band stated that they would release the full length video soon. On April 6, 2011, nearly a year after the video was shot, it was finally released. It shows the band dressed up as American soldiers patrolling the desert in an armored Humvee while showing scenes of war and leaders all while some unknown entity observes them and their action. Near the end of the video, various military vehicles (Humvees, tanks, fighter airplanes, helicopters, battleships) are flying seemingly uncontrollably above the men, towards a pile. The group's own Humvee gets sucked into the pile. The objects smashing into the pile get temporarily crushed but assume their normal un-crushed form after a second. As the camera shows the forming pile from afar, it is revealed that it forms into a huge pyramid, hovering over the desert. The video was directed by Edouard Salier. It won the Video of the Year Award on MSN Latinoamérica.

Track listing
All songs written by Jared Leto.

Promo (February 1, 2010)
 "This Is War" (album version) – 5:27

EU CD single (March 26, 2010)
 "This Is War" (album version) – 5:27
 "Hurricane" (LA Mix) By Emma Ford and Natalie Loren aka "Luxury Kills" – 5:49

Digital download EP
 "This Is War" (Album Version) – 5:47
 "This Is War" (Radio Edit) – 4:46
 "Night of the Hunter" (Static Revenger Redux) – 4:57

Charts

Weekly charts

Year-end charts

Certifications

Release history

In popular culture
The song has been included on the soundtrack of Dragon Age: Origins, as downloadable content for Rock Band, the Formula One video review of the 2010 Italian Grand Prix and in a promo for the TV shows Camelot and Revolution.
 This is War was used as the theme song for the first season of fan-made abridged parody of Sword Art Online by Something Witty Entertainment.

See also
List of number-one alternative rock singles of 2010 (U.S.)

References

Thirty Seconds to Mars songs
2009 songs
2010 singles
Songs written by Jared Leto
Song recordings produced by Steve Lillywhite
Song recordings produced by Flood (producer)
Virgin Records singles